Sauze d'Oulx is a town and comune in the Metropolitan City of Turin, Piedmont (northern Italy) located  from Turin in the Val di Susa, at the foot of Monte Genevris.

It was the site of the freestyle skiing events of the 2006 Olympic Winter Games.  Together with the villages of Pragelato, Sestriere, Claviere, Cesana Torinese, San Sicario and Montgenèvre, in France, it makes up the Via Lattea (Milky Way) skiing area.

Since the beginning of the 19th century, Sauze d'Oulx has been a destination for the Turin aristocracy, with its famous winter resort Sportinia and is still a skiing favourite because of its natural and accessible location.

History

Archaeological findings have proved the presence of Celtic settlements in the pre-Roman age. After the fall of the Western Roman Empire, in the Middle Ages it was owned by the Novalesa Abbey and then by the provosts of Oulx. From 1000, it was part of the Dauphiné and then of the Escartons Republic (until 1343); with the Treaty of Utrecht (1713) France gave it to the House of Savoy; in 1747 its territory was the seat of the Battle of Assietta between France and Savoy's Kingdom of Sardinia.

During the Fascist Era, in 1928, its name was changed to Salice d'Ulzio, "foreigner" words being forbidden, according to the etymological interpretation of "Sauze" as "salice" (Italian for willow). After World War II, the town became an autonomous comune and the previous name was restored.

References

Venues of the 2006 Winter Olympics